Vancouver iTech Preparatory (iTech Prep) is a public school located in Vancouver, Clark County, Washington, USA operated by Vancouver Public Schools.

It is a public STEM Magnet school for grades 6-12. The middle school program for grades 6-8 used to be operated at the Jim Parsley Community Center (J.P.C.C.) and the high school program for grades 9-12 at the main campus within Washington State University Vancouver.

The school now operates with all grades combined in their new building dedicated 2020.

The school focuses on STEM subjects (classes such as Physics, Algebra (1 and 2), Geometry, Pre Calculus, Statistics, Psychology, Sociology, Astronomy and Environmental Science) while using project-based learning, where a student is taught something then creates a workpiece that shows that the student learned what was taught. An example of this is being taught about the structure of the solar system then creating a scale model to show that they understand the structure of the solar system.

iTech also has in the past worked with WSUV and Clark College to get early college programs available to students who have spent at least 1 semester in the high school program.

The principal is Darby Meade and the associate principal is Zachary Tautfest.

References

External links
Official website
OSPI school report card 2012-13

High schools in Clark County, Washington
Educational institutions established in 2012
2012 establishments in Washington (state)